Balș is a commune in Iași County, Western Moldavia, Romania. It is composed of three villages: Balș, Boureni and Coasta Măgurii. These belonged to Târgu Frumos town until 2004, when they were split off to form a separate commune.

References

Communes in Iași County
Localities in Western Moldavia